Below is a list of mayors of Waterville, Maine, USA.

References

Waterville